Pratapsasan is a census town in Khordha district in the Indian state of Odisha.

Demographics
 India census, Pratapsasan had a population of 11,970. Males constitute 52% of the population and females 48%. Pratapsasan has an average literacy rate of 66%, higher than the national average of 59.5%: male literacy is 74%, and female literacy is 58%. In Pratapsasan, 11% of the population is under 6 years of age.

References

Cities and towns in Khordha district